This is a list of notable events in music that took place in the year 1934.

Specific locations
1934 in British music
1934 in Norwegian music

Specific genres
1934 in country music
1934 in jazz

Events
May 28 – The Glyndebourne festival of opera is inaugurated in England.
June – Baritone Sir Henry Lytton retires from the D'Oyly Carte Opera Company.
September–October – Folk song collector John Lomax makes the first recordings of "Rock Island Line" at prison farms in Arkansas.
November 7 – Sergei Rachmaninoff's Rhapsody on a Theme of Paganini (written July 3 – August 18 at the Villa Senar in Switzerland) is premiered with the composer at the piano at the Lyric Opera House in Baltimore, Maryland, with the Philadelphia Orchestra conducted by Leopold Stokowski. On December 24, the same ensemble make the first recording, at RCA Victor's Trinity Church Studio in Camden, New Jersey.
December 2 – First public performance by the Quintette du Hot Club de France at the École Normale de Musique in Paris, playing continental jazz, led by guitarist Django Reinhardt with violinist Stéphane Grappelli.
African American jazz musician Sun Ra's professional musical career begins.
Bengali poet Buddhadeb Bosu marries singer and writer Protiva Bose (née Ranu Shome).
The Fujiwara Opera, Japan's oldest professional western opera company, is founded in Tokyo by Yoshie Fujiwara.
John Serry Sr. appears regularly at the high society nightclub El Morocco in New York City.
A former London roller skating rink reopens as the BBC's Maida Vale Studios and it becomes the home of the BBC Symphony Orchestra.

Published popular music

 "All I Do Is Dream Of You" w. Arthur Freed m. Nacio Herb Brown. Introduced by Gene Raymond in the film Sadie McKee
 "All Through The Night" w.m. Cole Porter
 "Annie's Cousin Fannie" w.m. Glenn Miller
 "Anything Goes" w.m. Cole Porter
 "As Long as I Live" w. Ted Koehler m. Harold Arlen. Introduced by Lena Horne and Avon Long in the revue Cotton Club Parade
 "Autumn In New York" w.m. Vernon Duke
 "Baby, Take A Bow" w. Lew Brown m. Jay Gorney
 "Be Like The Bluebird" w.m. Cole Porter
 "Be Still, My Heart" w.m. Allan Flynn & Jack Egan
 "Beer Barrel Polka" w. (Czech) Vasek Zeman (Eng) Lew Brown m. Jaromir Vejvoda
 "Believe It, Beloved" w. George Whiting & Nat Schwartz m. J. C. Johnson
 "Big John's Special" m. Horace Henderson
 "Blame It On My Youth" w. Edward Heyman m. Oscar Levant
 "Blow, Gabriel, Blow" w.m. Cole Porter
 "Blue Moon" w. Lorenz Hart m. Richard Rodgers
 "The Bluebird Of Happiness" w. Edward Heyman & Harry Parr-Davies m. Sandor Hamati
 "Boll Weevil" w. Lead Belly
 "Cocktails for Two" w.m. Arthur Johnston & Sam Coslow
 "College Rhythm" w. Mack Gordon m. Harry Revel
 "The Continental" w. Herb Magidson m. Con Conrad. Introduced by Ginger Rogers in the film The Gay Divorcee
 "Dames" w. Al Dubin m. Harry Warren
 "Don't Let It Bother You" w. Mack Gordon m. Harry Revel from the film The Gay Divorcee
 "Don't Let Your Love Go Wrong" w. George Whiting & Nat Schwartz m. J. C. Johnson
 "Down South Camp Meeting" w. Irving Mills m. Fletcher Henderson
 "Easy Come, Easy Go" w. Edward Heyman m. Johnny Green
 "Everything Stops for Tea" w.m. Maurice Sigler, Al Goodhart & Al Hoffman
 "Faint Harmony" w. Desmond Carter m. Vivian Ellis from the musical Jill Darling
 "Fair And Warmer" w. Al Dubin m. Harry Warren
 "Fare Thee Well, Annabelle" w. Mort Dixon m. Allie Wrubel
 "Flirtation Walk" w. Mort Dixon m. Allie Wrubel
 "For All We Know" w. Sam M. Lewis m. J. Fred Coots
 "Fun To Be Fooled" w. Ira Gershwin & E. Y. Harburg m. Harold Arlen
 "Give Me A Heart To Sing To" w. Ned Washington m. Victor Young
 "Goodnight, My Love" w. Mack Gordon m. Harry Revel
 "The Gypsy In My Soul" w. Moe Jaffe m. Clay Boland
 "Hands Across The Table" w.(Eng) Mitchell Parish m. Jean Delettre
 "Here Come The British" w. Johnny Mercer m. Bernard Hanighen
 "Hold My Hand" w. Jack Yellen & Irving Caesar m. Ray Henderson
 "An Hour Ago This Minute" James Dyrenforth, John W. Green
 "The House Is Haunted" w. Billy Rose m. Basil G. Adlam. Introduced by Jane Froman in the revue Ziegfeld Follies of 1934
 "I Get a Kick out of You" w.m. Cole Porter
 "I Hate Myself" w. Benny Davis & Joe Young m. Milton Ager
 "I Never Had A Chance" w.m. Irving Berlin
 "I Only Have Eyes For You" w. Al Dubin m. Harry Warren
 "I Saw Stars" w.m. Maurice Sigler, Al Goodhart & Al Hoffman
 "I See Two Lovers" w. Mort Dixon m. Allie Wrubel
 "I Think I Can" Douglas Furber, Ray Noble
 "I Wish I Were Twins" w. Frank Loesser & Eddie DeLange m. Joseph Meyer
 "If" w. Robert Hargreaves & Stanley Damerell m. Tolchard Evans
 "If I Had A Million Dollars" w. Johnny Mercer m. Matty Malneck. Introduced by The Boswell Sisters in the film Transatlantic Merry-Go-Round.
 "If It Isn't Love" Burton, Jason
 "If There Is Someone Lovelier Than You" w. Howard Dietz m. Arthur Schwartz. Introduced by Georges Metaxa in the musical Revenge with Music
 "I'll Follow My Secret Heart" w.m. Noël Coward, Introduced by Noël Coward and Yvonne Printemps in the musical Conversation Piece
 "I'll String Along With You" w. Al Dubin m. Harry Warren
 "Ill Wind" w. Ted Koehler m. Harold Arlen. Introduced by Aida Ward in the revue Cotton Club Parade
 "I'm On A Seesaw" w. Desmond Carter m. Vivian Ellis from the musical Jill Darling
 "In My Little Bottom Drawer" w.m. Will Haines, Jimmy Harper & Maurice Beresford
 "Isle of Capri" w. Jimmy Kennedy m. Will Grosz
 "It's All Forgotten Now" w.m. Ray Noble
 "It's Foolish But It's Fun" w.m. Robert Stolz, Gus Kahn
 "It's Funny To Everyone But Me" w.m. Dave Franklin & Isham Jones
 "Judy" w.m. Hoagy Carmichael & Sammy Lerner
 "June In January" w. Leo Robin m. Ralph Rainger Movie: "Here Is My Heart"
 "Junk Man" w. Frank Loesser m. Joseph Meyer
 "Lady Fair" w.m. Cole Porter
 "Let's Take a Walk Around the Block" w. Ira Gershwin & E. Y. Harburg m. Harold Arlen. Introduced by Dixie Dunbar and Earl Oxford in the revue Life Begins at 8:40.
 "Little Dutch Mill" w. Ralph Freed m. Harry Barris
 "Little Man, You've Had a Busy Day" w. Maurice Sigler & Al Hoffman m. Mabel Wayne
 "Little Rock Getaway" m. Joe Sullivan
 "Lost In A Fog" w. Dorothy Fields m. Jimmy McHugh
 "Love In Bloom" w. Leo Robin m. Ralph Rainger
 "Love Is Just Around The Corner" w. Leo Robin m. Lewis E. Gensler
 "Love Thy Neighbour" w. Mack Gordon m. Harry Revel
 "May I?" w. Mack Gordon m. Harry Revel
 "Midnight, the Stars and You" Jimmy Campbell, Reg Connelly, Harry Woods
 "Miss Otis Regrets" w.m. Cole Porter
 "Moon Country" w. Johnny Mercer m. Hoagy Carmichael
 "The Moon Was Yellow" w. Edgar Leslie m. Fred E. Ahlert
 "Moonglow" w. Eddie DeLange m. Will Hudson & Irving Mills
 "Moonlight Is Silver" Clemence Dane, Richard Addinsell
 "My Old Flame" w. Sam Coslow m. Arthur Johnston
 "A New Moon Is Over My Shoulder" w. Arthur Freed m. Nacio Herb Brown
 "Nobody Loves A Fairy When She's Forty" w.m. Arthur Le Clerq
 "The Object Of My Affection" w.m. Pinky Tomlin, Coy Poe & Jimmie Grier
 "Okay Toots" w. Gus Kahn m. Walter Donaldson
 "On The Good Ship Lollipop" w.m. Sidney Clare & Richard A. Whiting
 "One Night Of Love" w. Gus Kahn m. Victor Schertzinger
 "Over My Shoulder" w.m. Harry Woods
 "Over Somebody Else's Shoulder" w.m. Al Sherman & Al Lewis
 "P.S. I Love You" w. Johnny Mercer m. Gordon Jenkins
 "Pardon My Southern Accent" w. Johnny Mercer m. Matty Malneck
 "Rhythm Is Our Business" w. Sammy Cahn m. Jimmie Lunceford
 "Ridin' Around in the Rain" w.m. Gene Austin & Carmen Lombardo
 "Riptide" w. Gus Kahn m. Walter Donaldson
 "Rock And Roll" w. Sidney Clare m. Richard A. Whiting
 "Rug Cutter's Swing" m. Horace Henderson
 "Santa Claus Is Coming To Town" w.m. Haven Gillespie & J. Fred Coots
 "She Reminds Me Of You" w. Mack Gordon m. Harry Revel. Introduced by Bing Crosby in the film We're Not Dressing
 "Sing As We Go" w.m. Harry Parr-Davies, Gracie Fields
 "(In My) Solitude" w. Eddie DeLange & Irving Mills m. Duke Ellington
 "Stars Fell on Alabama" w. Mitchell Parish m. Frank Perkins
 "Stay As Sweet As You Are" w. Mack Gordon m. Harry Revel. Introduced by Lanny Ross in the film College Rhythm
 "Stompin' at the Savoy" w. Andy Razaf m. Benny Goodman, Chick Webb & Edgar Sampson
 "Straight from the Shoulder (Right from the Heart)" w. Mack Gordon m. Harry Revel. Introduced by Bing Crosby and Kitty Carlisle in the film She Loves Me Not
 "The Sweetest Music This Side Of Heaven" w.m. Carmen Lombardo & Cliff Friend
 "Take a Number from One to Ten" w. Mack Gordon m. Harry Revel. Introduced by Lyda Roberti in the film College Rhythm.
 "Thank You So Much, Mrs Lowsborough-Goodby" w.m. Cole Porter
 "Then I'll Be Tired Of You" w. E. Y. Harburg m. Arthur Schwartz
"There Goes My Heart" w. Benny Davis m. Abner Silver
 "Trust in Me" w. Ned Wever m. Milton Ager and Jean Schwartz. Recorded by Mildred Bailey in 1937.
 "Tumbling Tumbleweeds" w.m. Bob Nolan
 "Two Cigarettes In The Dark" w. Paul Francis Webster m. Lew Pollack
 "The Very Thought Of You" w.m. Ray Noble
 "Wagon Wheels" w. Billy Hill m. Peter De Rose
 "What A Diff'rence A Day Made" w. (Eng) Stanley Adams (Sp) Maria Grever m. Maria Grever
 "What a Little Moonlight Can Do" w.m. Harry Woods
 "What Now?" Green, Dyrenforth
 "What's The Reason (I'm Not Pleasin' You)" w.m. Coy Poe, Jimmie Grier, Truman "Pinky" Tomlin & Earl Hatch
 "When A Woman Loves A Man" w. Johnny Mercer m. Bernie Hanighen & Gordon Jenkins
 "When I Grow Too Old To Dream" w. Oscar Hammerstein II m. Sigmund Romberg
 "When My Ship Comes In" w. Gus Kahn m. Walter Donaldson
 "When You've Got A Little Springtime In Your Heart" w.m. Harry Woods. Introduced by Jessie Matthews in the film Evergreen
 "Winter Wonderland" w. Richard B. Smith m. Felix Bernard
 "With Every Breath I Take" w. Leo Robin m. Ralph Rainger
 "With Her Head Tucked Underneath Her Arm" w.m. R. P. Weston & Bert Lee
 "With My Eyes Wide Open, I'm Dreaming" w. Mack Gordon m. Harry Revel. Introduced by Jack Oakie and Dorothy Dell in the film Shoot the Works. Performed by Dean Martin in the 1952 film The Stooge
 "Wonder Bar" w. Al Dubin m. Harry Warren
 "The World Owes Me a Living" w. Larry Morey m. Leigh Harline. Introduced by Pinto Colvig on the soundtrack of the animated short The Grasshopper and the Ants
 "Wrappin' It Up" m. Fletcher Henderson
 "You And The Night And The Music" w. Howard Dietz m. Arthur Schwartz
 "You Oughta Be in Pictures" w. Edward Heyman m. Dana Suesse
 "You're A Builder-Upper" w. Ira Gershwin & E. Y. Harburg m. Harold Arlen
 "You're Not The Only Oyster In The Stew" w. Johnny Burke m. Harold Spina
 "You're the Top" w.m. Cole Porter
 "Zing! Went the Strings of My Heart" w.m. James F. Hanley. Introduced by Hal Le Roy and Eunice Healey in the Broadway revue Thumbs Up!

Top Popular Recordings

The Great Depression continued to wreak havoc on the American record industry in 1934. The Grigsby-Grunow Company, owner of Columbia Phonograph Company, failed, and Columbia was put up for sale. Columbia operations, catalogue and trademarks, as well as Okeh Records, were purchased by the American Record Corporation (ARC) for $70,000 in July 1934. Columbia's pressing and warehouse facilities, along with equipment and machines, were absorbed by ARC, but for the next four years, both labels were dormant. Decca Records, Ltd., London, UK, formed Decca Records, Inc. in the United States, and began operations in August 1934. Three former Brunswick managers, including Jack Kapp, were hired.

The top popular records of 1934 listed below were compiled from Joel Whitburn's Pop Memories 1890–1954, record sales reported on the "Discography of American Historical Recordings" website, and other sources as specified. Numerical rankings are approximate, there were no Billboard charts in 1934, the numbers are only used for a frame of reference.

Top Christmas hits
"Winter Wonderland" – Richard Himber & His Orchestra
"Winter Wonderland" – Guy Lombardo

Classical music

Premieres

Compositions
Henk Badings
Symphony No. 3
Sonata, for cello and piano
Béla Bartók – String Quartet No. 5
Arnold Bax – Symphony No. 6
Benjamin Britten – Simple Symphony
George Enescu – Piano Sonata No. 1 in F-sharp major, Op. 24, No. 1
John Fernström – Symphony No. 4, Op. 27
Alexander Glazunov – Saxophone Concerto
Karl Amadeus Hartmann – Miserae
Qunihico Hashimoto – Cantata Celebrating the Birth of the Prince
Jacques Ibert – Flute Concerto
Darius Milhaud – Concertino de Printemps, for violin and orchestra
Sergei Prokofiev – Egyptian Nights suite
Nico Richter – Sonatine, for piano
Harald Sæverud – Canto Ostinato
Arnold Schoenberg – Suite in G major, for string orchestra
Leopold Spinner – Passacaglia
Germaine Tailleferre – Concerto for 2 Pianos, Eight Solo Voices, Saxophone Quartet and Orchestra
Eduard Tubin – Symphony No. 1 in C minor (1931–34)
Edgard Varèse – Ecuatorial (1932–34)
Heitor Villa-Lobos – Uirapuru, symphonic poem and ballet (begun 1917)
Kōsaku Yamada – Nagauta Symphony

Opera
 Vittorio Giannini – Lucedia
 Gustav Holst – The Wandering Scholar
 Leoš Janáček – Destiny
 Dmitri Shostakovich – Lady Macbeth of the Mtsensk District
 Virgil Thomson – Four Saints in Three Acts (libretto by Gertrude Stein)

Film
 Hubert Bath – Wings Over Everest
 Willy Schmidt-Gentner – Maskerade (film)
 Max Steiner – The Lost Patrol (1934 film)

Jazz

Musical theatre
 Anything Goes – Broadway production opened at the Alvin Theatre on November 21 and ran for 420 performances
 The Bing Boys Are Here – London revival
 Calling All Stars – Broadway revue with music by Harry Akst and lyrics by Lew Brown
Caviar Broadway production opened at the Forrest Theatre on June 7 and ran for 20 performances
 Cotton Club Parade – Cotton Club Harlem, starring Adelaide Hall ran for eight months.
 Conversation Piece – London productions opened at His Majesty's Theatre on February 16 and ran for 177 performances
 Conversation Piece – Broadway production opened at the 44th Street Theatre on October 23 and ran for 55 performances
 The Great Waltz – Broadway production opened at the Center Theatre on September 22 and ran for 298 performances. The show returned only two months later for a further run of 49 performances.
 Here's How London production opened at the Saville Theatre on February 22. Starring George Robey.
 Jill Darling – London production opened at the Saville Theatre on December 19 and ran for 242 performances. Starring Frances Day, John Mills and Louise Browne.
 Lucky Break – London production opened at the Shaftesbury Theatre on November 14 and ran for 198 performances
 Mr. Whittington London production opened at the Hippodrome on February 1. Starring Jack Buchanan and Elsie Randolph.
 Revenge with Music Broadway production opened on November 28 at the New Amsterdam Theatre and ran for 158 performances
 Sporting Love opened at the Gaiety Theatre on March 31 and ran for 302 performances
 Streamline London production opened at the Palace Theatre on September 28
 Thumbs Up! Broadway revue opened at the St. James Theatre on December 27 and ran for 156 performances.
Yes, Madam? (Music: Jack Waller and Joseph Tunbridge Lyrics: R. P. Weston and Bert Lee Book: R. P. Weston, Bert Lee and R. G. Browne) London production opened at the Hippodrome on September 27 and ran for 302 performances
 Yours Sincerely London revue opened at Daly's Theatre on February 19. Starring Binnie Barnes.
 Ziegfeld Follies of 1934 Broadway revue opened at the Winter Garden Theatre on January 4 and ran for 182 performances

Musical films
 Babes In Toyland starring Stan Laurel and Oliver Hardy
 Bachelor of Arts starring Tom Brown, Anita Louise, Henry Walthall, Arline Judge and Mae Marsh. Directed by Louis King.
 Belle of the Nineties starring Mae West
 The Big Road, starring Jin Yan and Li Lili (silent film with music and sound effects added post-production)
 Blossom Time starring Richard Tauber
 Boots! Boots! starring George Formby and Beryl Formby, and featuring Betty Driver and Harry Hudson & his Band
 Bottoms Up starring Spencer Tracy, Pat Paterson, John Boles and Thelma Todd
 The Cat and the Fiddle starring Ramon Novarro, Jeanette MacDonald, Frank Morgan and Vivienne Segal
 Cockeyed Cavaliers starring Bert Wheeler, Robert Woolsey, Dorothy Lee, Noah Beery and Thelma Todd. Directed by Mark Sandrich.
 College Rhythm starring Joe Penner, Jack Oakie, Lyda Roberti and Lanny Ross
 Dames starring Joan Blondell, Dick Powell, Ruby Keeler and Zasu Pitts.
 Down to Their Last Yacht starring Mary Boland, Polly Moran and Ned Sparks. Directed by Paul Sloane.
 Evergreen starring Jessie Matthews
 The Gay Divorcee starring Fred Astaire and Ginger Rogers
 Gay Love starring Florence Desmond and Sophie Tucker
 George White's Scandals starring Alice Faye, Rudy Vallee, Jimmy Durante and Cliff Edwards
 Gift of Gab starring Edmund Lowe, Ruth Etting and Ethel Waters
Give Her a Ring starring Wendy Barrie
 The Grasshopper and the Ants animated short
Happiness Ahead starring Dick Powell and Dorothy Dare
 Here Is My Heart starring Bing Crosby and Kitty Carlisle. Directed by Frank Tuttle.
 Hips, Hips, Hooray! starring Bert Wheeler, Robert Woolsey, Thelma Todd and Ruth Etting
 Hollywood Party starring Stan Laurel, Oliver Hardy, Jimmy Durante, Lupe Vélez, Polly Moran, Charles Butterworth, Frances Williams, June Clyde and Mickey Mouse. Directed by Ray Rowland.
 Kid Millions starring Eddie Cantor, Ann Sothern, Ethel Merman and George Murphy.
 Melody in Spring starring Lanny Ross, Mary Boland, Charles Ruggles and Ann Sothern.
 The Merry Widow starring Maurice Chevalier, Jeanette MacDonald, Edward Everett Horton and Una Merkel
 Moulin Rouge starring Constance Bennett and Franchot Tone and featuring Russ Columbo and The Boswell Sisters.
 Mister Cinders starring W. H. Berry, Clifford Mollison and Zelma O'Neal
 Murder at the Vanities starring Carl Brisson, Kitty Carlisle, Victor McLaglen and Jack Oakie and featuring Duke Ellington.
 Music in the Air starring Gloria Swanson and John Boles
 She Loves Me Not starring Bing Crosby, Miriam Hopkins and Kitty Carlisle.
 Shoot the Works starring Jack Oakie, Ben Bernie and Dorothy Dell
 Student Tour starring Jimmy Durante, Charles Butterworth, Maxine Doyle, Phil Regan, Monte Blue, Betty Grable and Nelson Eddy. Directed by Charles Reisner.
 Transatlantic Merry-Go-Round released November 1, starring Gene Raymond, Nancy Carroll, Mitzi Green and Frank Parker and featuring The Boswell Sisters, Jean Sargent and Jimmie Grier and his Orchestra.
 Wake Up and Dream starring Russ Columbo, June Knight and Wini Shaw.
 Waltzes from Vienna, starring Jessie Matthews
 We're Not Dressing starring Bing Crosby, Carole Lombard, George Burns, Gracie Allen and Ethel Merman.
 Wonder Bar starring Al Jolson, Kay Francis, Dolores del Río and Dick Powell
 Zouzou, starring Josephine Baker and Jean Gabin

Births
January 16 – Marilyn Horne, mezzo soprano
January 21 – Eva Olmerová, Czech pop and jazz musician (died 1993)
January 24 – Ann Cole, American singer (died 1986)
January 26 – Huey "Piano" Smith, American R&B pianist (died 2023)
January 30 – Tammy Grimes, actress and singer (died 2016)
February 1 – Bob Shane, folk singer (The Kingston Trio) (died 2020)
February 2 – Skip Battin, rock singer-songwriter (The Byrds, New Riders of the Purple Sage) (died 2003)
February 7
King Curtis, saxophonist (died 1971)
Earl King, American singer-songwriter, guitarist and producer (died 2003)
February 8 – Jan Kirsznik, Polish rock saxophonist (died 2018)
February 14 – Florence Henderson, actress and singer (died 2016)
 February 23
 Yevgeny Krylatov, Soviet and Russian composer (died 2019)
 Augusto Algueró, Spanish composer (died 2011)
February 24 – Renata Scotto, operatic soprano
March 4 – John Dunn, DJ (died 2004)
March 8 – Christian Wolff, composer
March 18 – Charley Pride, country singer and baseball player (died 2020)
March 25 – Johnny Burnette, rockabilly pioneer (died 1964)
March 29 – Delme Bryn-Jones, operatic baritone (died 2001)
March 31
Richard Chamberlain, actor and singer
Shirley Jones, singer and actress
John D. Loudermilk, singer-songwriter (died 2016)
April 1 – Jim Ed Brown, country singer-songwriter (The Browns) (died 2015)
April 16 – Robert Stigwood, music promoter (died 2015)
April 19 – Dickie Goodman, pioneer of music sampling (died 1989)
April 24 – Shirley MacLaine, born Shirley MacLean Beaty, American actress and singer
April 29 – Otis Rush, blues musician (died 2018)
May 1 – Shirley Horn, American singer (died 2005)
May 3 – Frankie Valli, singer (The Four Seasons)
May 5
Ace Cannon, saxophonist (died 2018)
Johnnie Taylor, singer-songwriter (died 2000)
May 6 – Oskar Gottlieb Blarr, composer
May 9 – Soo Bee Lee, operatic soprano (died 2005)
May 24 – Dr Barry Rose, English choir-trainer and organist
June 1 – Pat Boone, singer
June 9 – Jackie Wilson, singer (died 1984)
June 11 – James "Pookie" Hudson R&B frontman (The Spaniels) (died 2007)
June 21 – Luigi Albertelli, Italian lyricist
June 24 – Gloria Christian, Italian canzone Napoletana singer
June 26 – Dave Grusin, American pianist and composer
July 8 – Alice Gerrard, American singer and banjo player
July 12 – Van Cliburn, American concert pianist (died 2013)
July 15 – Harrison Birtwistle, composer (died 2022)
July 21 – Jonathan Miller, opera director and polymath (died 2019)
July 28 – Jacques d'Amboise, dancer and choreographer
July 30 – André Prévost, composer (died 2001)
August 5 – Vern Gosdin, country music singer (died 2009)
August 9 – Merle Kilgore, country singer/songwriter (died 2005)
August 10 – James Tenney, composer and music theorist (died 2006)
August 18 – Ronnie Carroll, Northern Irish popular singer (died 2015)
September 3 – Freddie King, blues guitarist and singer (died 1976)
September 4 – Otto Brandenburg, Danish singer and actor (died 2007)
September 5 – Bira, Brazilian musician and guitarist (died 2019)
September 7 – Little Milton, blues singer and guitarist (died 2005)
September 8 – Peter Maxwell Davies, composer (died 2016)
September 16 – Ronnie Drew, Irish folk musician (died 2008)
September 19 – Brian Epstein, manager of The Beatles (died 1967)
September 21 – Leonard Cohen, poet and singer (died 2016)
October 1 – Geoff Stephens, songwriter and record producer (died 2020)
October 17 – Rico Rodriguez, ska trombonist (died 2015)
October 20 – Eddie Harris, saxophonist (died 1996)
October 26 – Jacques Loussier, classical/jazz pianist (died 2019)
October 30 – Frans Brüggen, Dutch flutist, recorder player and conductor (died 2014) 
November 1 – William Mathias, composer (died 1992)
November 7 – Sunanda Patnaik, Indian classical singer (died 2020)
November 11 – Willi Tokarev, Russian-American singer-songwriter (died 2019)
November 15 – Peter Dickinson, composer and musicologist
November 18 – Tulsidas Borkar, Indian composer (died 2018)
November 19 – Dave Guard, folk singer (The Kingston Trio) (died 1991)
November 24 – Alfred Schnittke, composer (died 1998)
December 1 – Billy Paul, soul singer (died 2016)
December 9 – Alan Ridout, composer and music teacher (died 1996)
December 12 – Habib Hassan Touma, composer and ethnomusicologist (died 1998)
December 19 – Rudi Carrell, Dutch singer, entertainer (died 2006)
December 30
Del Shannon, singer (died 1990)
Russ Tamblyn, dancer, singer and actor

Deaths
January 12 – Paul Kochanski, violinist, composer and arranger, 46 (cancer)
January 18 – Otakar Ševčík, violinist, 81
February 4 – Ernesto Nazareth, pianist and composer, 70 (drowned)
February 23 – Edward Elgar, composer, 76
February 24 – Pyotr Slovtsov, operatic tenor, 47
February 27 – Gene Rodemich, pianist and orchestra leader, 43
March 21 – Franz Schreker, composer and conductor, 55
April 12 – Thaddeus Cahill, inventor of the teleharmonium
April 22 – Augusto de Lima, writer and musician
April 28 – Charlie Patton, blues musician, 42
May 7 – Edward Naylor, organist and composer, 57
May 19 – Émile Pierre Ratez, violist and composer, 82
May 25 – Gustav Holst, composer, 59 (complications following surgery)
May 26 – Robert Samut, composer of the Maltese national anthem, 64
June 10 – Frederick Delius, composer, 82
June 13 – Charlie Gardiner, ice hockey player and amateur singer (born 1904) (brain hemorrhage)
July 14 – Ernst Eduard Taubert, composer, 95
September 2
Russ Columbo, violinist, 26 (shot)
Alcide Nunez, jazz musician, 50
September 10 – Sir George Henschel, operatic baritone, pianist and conductor, 84
September 24 – Edwin Lemare, organist and composer, 68
October 3 – Henri Marteau, violinist, 60
October 13 – Theodore Baker, musicologist, 83
October 14 – Leonid Sobinov, operatic tenor, 62 (heart attack)
November 12 – Henri Verbrugghen, violinist and conductor, 61
November 14 – Blanche Ray Alden, pianist and composer, 64
December 15 – Bernhard Sekles, composer and music teacher, 62
December 19 – Francis Planté, pianist, 95
date unknown
Eddie Anthony, jazz violinist (born 1890)
Olimpia Boronat, operatic soprano
Alice Verlet, operatic soprano (born 1873)

References

 
20th century in music
Music by year